Kurt Borkenhagen (30 December 1919 – May 2012) was a German international footballer who played for Fortuna Düsseldorf. Once he played in the National Team (1952).

References

Further reading 
 Werner Raupp: Toni Turek – „Fußballgott“. Eine Biographie. Hildesheim: Arete Verlag 2019, S. 73–97, 135 f.

External links
 
 

1919 births
2012 deaths
Association football defenders
German footballers
Germany international footballers
Fortuna Düsseldorf players